William "Billy" Meehan was the de facto leader of the Philadelphia Republican Party for the second half of the twentieth century, though he formally held a title of "of counsel". His father was Austin Meehan, also an influential Philadelphia Republican and former sheriff of Philadelphia.The Philadelphia Republican Party, in the wake of the political realignment in Philadelphia politics starting with the Home Rule Charter in 1951 and the election of "reform" Democrats, Richardson Dilworth and Joseph S. Clark as Mayor of Philadelphia, entered a period of gradual and persistent decline, after having dominated the city's politics for a century prior to home rule. Meehan managed the party with an accommodating practice to his counterparts on the Democratic side, often favouring for minor patronage-related jobs for party activists in various levels of city government.

Meehan dominated the Party in a structure roughly analogous to old-style machine politics, with an emphasis on strong personality leadership. With only one exception (Frank Rizzo in 1991), no Republican Party candidate was able to be nominated for citywide office without Meehan's blessing. Meehan was noted for the annual summer clambake, which he held at his residence in the Somerton section of Philadelphia, a heavily Republican stronghold. He was succeeded in the role of guiding the Philadelphia Republican Party, in an unofficial manner, by his son, Michael "Mike" Meehan.

References

Year of birth missing
Year of death missing
Pennsylvania Republicans